Galbertstown  can refer to either
Galbertstown Lower, a townland in Fertiana civil parish in County Tipperary  
Galbertstown Upper, a townland in Fertiana civil parish in County Tipperary